NGC 7022 is a barred lenticular galaxy located about 95 million light-years away from Earth in the constellation Indus. The galaxy was discovered by astronomer John Herschel on October 2, 1834.

See also 
 Barred lenticular galaxy 
 List of NGC objects (7001–7840)
 NGC 16
 NGC 2787

References

External links 

Barred lenticular galaxies
Indus (constellation)
7022
66224
Astronomical objects discovered in 1834